Austria first became a center of Jewish learning during the 13th century. However, increasing antisemitism led to the expulsion of the Jews in 1669. Following formal readmission in 1848, a sizable Jewish community developed once again, contributing strongly to Austrian culture. By the 1930s, 300,000 Jews lived in Austria, most of them in Vienna. Following the Anschluss with Nazi Germany, most of the community emigrated or were killed in the Holocaust. The current Austrian Jewish population is 9,000. The following is a list of some prominent Austrian Jews. Here German-speaking Jews from the whole Habsburg monarchy are listed.

Athletes
 Margarete "Grete" Adler, swimmer, Olympic bronze (4x100-m freestyle relay)
 Richard Bergmann, Austria/Britain table tennis player, seven-time world champion, ITTF Hall of Fame
 Hedy Bienenfeld (1907–1976), Austrian-American Olympic swimmer
 Albert Bogen (Albert Bógathy), fencer (saber), Olympic silver
 Fritzi Burger, figure skater, two-time Olympic silver, two-time World Championship silver
 Robert Fein (1907–1975), Olympic Champion weightlifter
 Siegfried "Fritz" Flesch, fencer (sabre), Olympic bronze
 Alfred Guth (1908–1996), Austrian-born American water polo player, swimmer, and Olympic modern pentathlete 
 Hans Haas, weightlifter, Olympic champion (lightweight), silver
 Judith Haspel (born "Judith Deutsch"), Austrian-born Israeli swimmer, held every Austrian women's middle and long-distance freestyle record in 1935, refused to represent Austria in 1936 Summer Olympics along with Ruth Langer and Lucie Goldner, protesting Hitler, stating, "I refuse to enter a contest in a land which so shamefully persecutes my people."
 Dr. Otto Herschmann, fencer (saber), 2-time Olympic silver winner (in fencing/team sabre and 100-m freestyle); arrested by Nazis, and died in Izbica concentration camp
 Nickolaus "Mickey" Hirschl, wrestler, two-time Olympic bronze (heavyweight freestyle and Greco-Roman), shot put and discus junior champion, weightlifting junior champion, and pentathlon champion
 Felix Kasper, figure skater, Olympic bronze
Alfred König (1913–1987), Austrian-Turkish Olympic sprinter
 Ruth Langer (1921-1999) was an Austrian national champion swimmer who refused to attend the 1936 Summer Olympics, along with Judith Haspel and Lucie Goldner. 
Fritzi Löwy (1910–1994), Austrian Olympic swimmer
 Klara Milch, swimmer, Olympic bronze (4x100-m freestyle relay)
 Paul Neumann, swimmer, Olympic champion (500-m freestyle)
 Fred Oberlander, Austrian, British, and Canadian wrestler; world champion (freestyle heavyweight); Maccabiah champion
 Felix Pipes, tennis player, Olympic silver (doubles)
 Maxim Podoprigora, Olympic swimmer
 Ellen Preis, fencer (foil), three-time world champion (1947, 1949, and 1950), Olympic champion, 17-time Austrian champion
 Otto Scheff (born "Otto Sochaczewsky"), swimmer, Olympic champion (400-m freestyle) and two-time bronze (400-m freestyle, 1,500-m freestyle)
 Josephine Sticker, swimmer, Olympic bronze (4x100-m freestyle relay)
 Otto Wahle, Austria/US swimmer, two-time Olympic silver (1,000-m freestyle, 200-m obstacle race) and bronze (400-m freestyle); International Swimming Hall of Fame

Historical figures

Politicians
 Bruno Kreisky, Chancellor of Austria 1970–1983, agnostic
 Ignaz Kuranda, politician
 , politician, Minister of Finance in the early 1930s
 Otto Bauer, Foreign Minister 1918–1919
 Franz Klein, Minister of Justice 1906–1908, and in 1916

Revolutionaries
 Simon Deutsch (1822–1877), revolutionary

Academic figures

Lawyers
 Fred F. Herzog, only Jewish judge in Austria between the World Wars; fled to the United States and became the dean of two law schools

Scientists
 Carl Djerassi, chemist, inventor of the pill
 Sir Otto Frankel, geneticist 
 Jakob Erdheim, pathologist (Erdheim–Chester disease).
 Eric Kandel, neuroscientist, winner of 2000 Nobel Prize in Physiology or Medicine
 Karl Koller, ophthalmologist; first to use cocaine as an anaesthetic 
 Hans Kronberger, nuclear physicist
 Robert von Lieben, physicist (Jewish father) 
 Victor Frederick Weisskopf (1908–2002), physicist; during World War II, worked at Los Alamos on the Manhattan Project to develop the atomic bomb; later campaigned against the proliferation of nuclear weapons
 Max Perutz, molecular biologist, winner of 1962 Nobel Prize for Chemistry
 Lise Meitner, physicist, discovered nuclear fission of uranium with * Otto Hahn, namegiver of element 109 * meitnerium

Psychologists, psychotherapists and psychiatrists
 Alfred Adler, founding member of the Vienna Psychoanalytic Society and founder of the school of individual psychology
 Anna Freud, Vienna-born child psychologist and daughter of Sigmund Freud
 Sigmund Freud, Moravian-born founder of psychoanalysis and neurologist
 Marie Jahoda, psychologist 
 Melanie Klein, psychotherapy
 Heinz Kohut, psychiatrist and psychoanalyst
 Wilhelm Reich, psychiatry and psychoanalysis
 Viktor Frankl, psychiatrist and psychologist

Social and political scientists
 Guido Adler, Moravian musicologist
 Hugo Bergmann, philosopher
 Hugo Botstiber, musicologist
 Paul Edwards, philosopher 
 Heinrich Friedjung, Moravian historian and politician 
 Norbert Jokl, founder of Albanology
 Otto Kurz, historian 
 Emil Lederer, economist
 Ludwig von Mises, economist
 Otto Neurath, economist, sociologist, philosopher
 Ludwig Wittgenstein, philosopher (of largely Jewish descent but given a Catholic burial)

Cultural figures

Film and stage
 Rudolf Bing (1902–1997), opera impresario, General Manager of the Metropolitan Opera in New York from 1950 to 1972
 Fritz Grünbaum (1880–1941), cabaret artist, operetta and pop songwriter, director, actor and master of ceremonies
 Alber Misak, actor
 Kurt Kren (1929–1998), experimental filmmaker, director of the avant garde films 8/64: Ana – Aktion Brus, 10/65: Selbstverstümmelung, 10b/65: Silber – Aktion Brus, 16/67: 20. September, and 10c/65: Brus wünscht euch seine Weihnachten (Jewish father)
 Reggie Nalder (1907–1991), cabaret dancer, stage, film and television actor
 Joseph Schildkraut (1896–1964), stage and film actor
 Frederick Schrecker (1892–1976), actor of film, stage and TV
 Harry Schein (1924–2006), founder of the Swedish Film Institute, writer, chemical engineer
 Elisabeth Freundlich, playwright and journalist who reported on the Frankfurt Auschwitz Trials - Holocaust survivor

Musicians
 Kurt Adler (1907–1977), Bohemian born Austrian chorus master, conductor, pianist, author, Metropolitan Opera New York City, United States
 Ignaz Brüll, composer and pianist
 Hanns Eisler (1898–1962), composer and co-author (with Theodor W. Adorno) of Komposition für den Film (Jewish father)
 Joseph Joachim, violinist (born in Kittsee, Austria, at that time Hungary)
 Hans Keller, musicologist
 Fritz Kreisler (1875–1962), violinist and composer, one of the most famous of his day
 Erica Morini, violinist 
 Erwin Schulhoff (1894–1942), composer and pianist
 Julius Schulhoff (1825–1898), pianist and composer
 Rudolf Schwarz, conductor
 Walter Susskind (1913–1980), conductor
 Richard Tauber, singer and composer
 Egon Wellesz, composer

Composers
 Erich Wolfgang Korngold, composer (born in Bohemia)
 Fritz Kreisler (1875–1962), violinist and composer, one of the most famous of his day
 Gustav Mahler, Bohemian-born composer, conductor and pianist
 Arnold Schoenberg (1871–1954), composer (born in Vienna); founder of Second Viennese School; music theorist

Writers
 Peter Altenberg, writer and poet
 Raphael Basch (1813–?), journalist and politician
 Abraham Benisch (1814–1878), Hebraist and journalist; born Bohemia
 Henri Blowitz, journalist
 Boris Brainin (Sepp Österreicher), poet and translator
 Fritz Brainin, poet
 Bernard Friedberg, Hebraist, scholar and bibliographer
 Elfriede Jelinek (born 1946), Nobel prize-winning (2004) novelist (Jewish father).
 Franz Kafka, writer
 Paul Kornfeld (1889–1942), writer, author of many expressionist plays
 Karl Kraus, author
 Heinrich Landesmann, poet 
 Robert Lucas, writer, emigrated to Britain in 1934
 Joseph Roth, novelist and journalist
 Felix Salten, Hungarian-born Austrian writer
 Arthur Schnitzler, writer and physician
 Alice Schwarz-Gardos (1915–2007), writer, journalist and editor-in-chief of Israel-Nachrichten 1975-2007 (Alice Schwarz-Gardos )
 Hugo Sonnenschein, Bohemian-born writer 
 Regine Ulmann, editor, educator and feminist
 Franz Werfel, novelist and playwright
 Alma Wittlin (1899–1992), art historian and museologist
 Stefan Zweig, writer

Miscellaneous
 Haim Bar-Lev, Chief of Staff of Israel Defence Forces (1968–1971)
 Alfred Edersheim, Bible scholar
 Rudolf Eisler (1873–1926), Jewish philosopher, born in Vienna
 Josef Frank (1885–1967), architect
 Maurice de Hirsch, banker
 Isaak Löw Hofmann, Edler von Hofmannsthal, merchant
 Gisela Januszewska (1867–1943), physician
 Moritz Steinschneider (1816–1907), bibliographer and Orientalist
 George Weidenfeld, publisher 
 Simon Wiesenthal, Holocaust survivor and Nazi hunter

Others
 Viktor Aptowitzer (1871–1942), born in Tarnopol, Galizien, Jewish theologian, Talmudist
 Rudolf Auspitz (1837–1906), Austrian politician, entrepreneur (Unternehmer) 
 Joseph Samuel Bloch (1850–1923), born in Dukla, Galizien, Austrian publicist, politician 
 Ludo Moritz Hartmann, Austrian Jewish historian and statesman 
 Paul Hatvani, Paul Hirsch (1892–1975), born in Kew, near Melbourne, Austrian Jewish writer, chemist 
 Neta Alchimister, Israeli model

See also
 History of the Jews in Austria
 List of Austrians
 List of composers influenced by the Holocaust
 List of Czech and Slovak Jews
 List of Galician Jews
 List of German Jews
 List of Hungarian Jews
 List of Polish Jews
 List of Romanian Jews
 List of South-East European Jews
 List of Ukrainian Jews
 List of West European Jews
 Lists of Jews

Footnotes

 
 
Austrian Jews
Jews
Jews,Austrian